The 12th Golden Raspberry Awards were held on March 29, 1992, at the Hollywood Roosevelt Hotel to recognize the worst the movie industry had to offer in 1991.

Awards and nominations

Films with multiple nominations 
These films received multiple nominations:

See also

1991 in film
64th Academy Awards
45th British Academy Film Awards
49th Golden Globe Awards

References

External links
Razzie Awards 1992 on imdb 

Golden Raspberry Awards
Golden Raspberry Awards ceremonies
1992 in American cinema
1992 in California
Golden Raspberry